Wellington City Council is a territorial authority in New Zealand, governing the country's capital city Wellington, and de facto second-largest city (if the commonly considered parts of Wellington, the Upper Hutt, Porirua, Lower Hutt and often the Kapiti Coast, are taken into account; these, however have independent councils rather than a supercity governance like Auckland, and so Wellington City is legally only third-largest city by population, behind Auckland and Christchurch). It consists of the central historic town and certain additional areas within the Wellington metropolitan area, extending as far north as Linden and covering rural areas such as Mākara and Ohariu. The city adjoins Porirua in the north and Hutt City in the north-east. It is one of nine territorial authorities in the Wellington Region.

Wellington attained city status in 1886. The settlement had become the colonial capital and seat of government by 1865, replacing Auckland. Parliament officially sat in Wellington for the first time on 26 July 1865. During the last half of the nineteenth century, Wellington grew rapidly from 7,460 residents in 1867 to 49,344 by the end of the century.

It administers public works, sanitation, land use and building consents, among other local services. The council has used the marketing slogan "Absolutely Positively Wellington" in an official capacity since the early 1990s.

Council and committees

The Mayor and all Councillors are members of Council. Following a review in 2021 by former Local Government New Zealand chief executive Peter Winder, the Council adopted a new committee structure. All committees apart from Te Kaunihera o Pōneke Council and Ngutu Taki CEO Performance Review Committee include two mana whenua representatives, who are paid and have voting rights.

Wellington's local electoral wards were given Māori names in 2018, after consultation with mana whenua.

Mayor

One mayor is elected at large from the entire Wellington City district.

Te Whanganui-a-Tara Māori ward 
Te Whanganui a Tara is a Māori ward created by Wellington City Council in 2021. The 2022 election returned Nīkau Wi-Neera as its first-ever councillor.

Motukairangi/Eastern Ward
Motukairangi/Eastern Ward returns three councillors to the Wellington City Council. Since 2022 the councillors are:

Pukehīnau/Lambton Ward
Pukehīnau/Lambton Ward returns three councillors to the Wellington City Council. Since 2022 the councillors are:

Takapū/Northern Ward
Takapū/Northern Ward returns three councillors to the Wellington City Council. Since 2022 the councillors are:

Wharangi/Onslow-Western Ward

Wharangi/Onslow-Western Ward returns three councillors to the Wellington City Council. Since 2022 the councillors are:

Paekawakawa/Southern Ward

Paekawakawa/Southern Ward is the only ward that returns two councillors to the Wellington City Council (all others returning one or three). Since 2022 the councillors are:

Community Boards
The Council has created two local community boards under the provisions of Part 4 of the Local Government Act 2002, with members elected using a single transferable vote (STV) system or appointed by the Council.

These are:
Tawa Community Board, having six elected members and two appointed members, representing the northern suburbs of Tawa, Grenada North and Takapū Valley; and
Mākara/Ōhāriu Community Board, having six elected members, representing the rural suburbs of Ohariu, Mākara and Mākara Beach.

Coat of arms

Demographics

Wellington City had a population of 202,737 at the 2018 New Zealand census, an increase of 11,781 people (6.2%) since the 2013 census, and an increase of 23,271 people (13.0%) since the 2006 census. There were 74,841 households. There were 98,823 males and 103,911 females, giving a sex ratio of 0.95 males per female. The median age was 34.1 years (compared with 37.4 years nationally), with 32,856 people (16.2%) aged under 15 years, 54,999 (27.1%) aged 15 to 29, 93,669 (46.2%) aged 30 to 64, and 21,213 (10.5%) aged 65 or older.

Ethnicities were 74.1% European/Pākehā, 8.6% Māori, 5.1% Pacific peoples, 18.3% Asian, and 4.5% other ethnicities (totals add to more than 100% since people could identify with multiple ethnicities).

The proportion of people born overseas was 33.4%, compared with 27.1% nationally.

Although some people objected to giving their religion, 53.2% had no religion, 31.4% were Christian, 3.7% were Hindu, 1.6% were Muslim, 1.7% were Buddhist and 3.3% had other religions.

Of those at least 15 years old, 74,922 (44.1%) people had a bachelor or higher degree, and 12,690 (7.5%) people had no formal qualifications. The median income was $41,800, compared with $31,800 nationally. The employment status of those at least 15 was that 96,453 (56.8%) people were employed full-time, 24,738 (14.6%) were part-time, and 7,719 (4.5%) were unemployed.

Suburbs 
Wellington city has 57 officially defined suburbs; one can group them by the wards used to elect the City Council. Some areas, while officially forming part of a larger suburb (or several suburbs), are considered by some to be separate communities. The officially defined suburbs include:

Takapū Northern Ward 
 official: Churton Park; Glenside; Grenada North; Grenada Village; Horokiwi; Johnsonville; Newlands; Ohariu; Paparangi; Takapu Valley; Tawa; Woodridge
informal: Greenacres; Linden; Redwood

Wharangi Onslow-Western Ward 
 official: Broadmeadows; Crofton Downs; Kaiwharawhara; Karori; Khandallah; Mākara; Mākara Beach; Ngaio; Ngauranga; Northland; Wadestown; Wilton.
 informal: Cashmere; Chartwell; Highland Park; Rangoon Heights; Te Kainga

Pukehīnau Lambton Ward 
 official: Aro Valley; Highbury; Kelburn; Mount Cook; Mount Victoria; Oriental Bay; Pipitea; Te Aro; Thorndon; Wellington

Within Lambton Ward, the Council's tourism agency has designated three inner-city "quarters", as marketing subdivisions to promote international and domestic tourism. They are:
 Courtenay Quarter, centred around Courtenay Place
 Cuba Quarter, centred around Cuba Street
 Lambton Quarter, centred around Lambton Quay
 The Waterfront Quarter, centred around the waterfront

Paekawakawa Southern Ward 
 official: Berhampore; Brooklyn; Island Bay; Kingston; Mornington; Newtown; Ōwhiro Bay; Southgate; Vogeltown
 informal: Kowhai Park

Motukairangi Eastern Ward 
 official: Breaker Bay; Hataitai; Houghton Bay; Karaka Bays; Kilbirnie; Lyall Bay; Maupuia; Melrose; Miramar; Moa Point; Rongotai; Roseneath; Seatoun; Strathmore Park
informal: Crawford; Seatoun Bays; Seatoun Heights; Miramar Heights; Strathmore Heights.

Council-owned companies and enterprises 

The Wellington City Council owns or directly operates several companies.

The Council is a part-owner of Wellington Airport, and has two representatives on the airport's board. Mayor Andy Foster has been a member of the board since 2016, but has been criticised for poor attendance at board meetings.

The seven council-controlled organisations (CCOs) are
 Basin Reserve Trust
 Karori Sanctuary Trust (ZEALANDIA)
 Wellington Cable Car Ltd 
 Wellington Museums Trust (ExperienceWellington), which operates City Gallery Wellington and the Museum of Wellington City & Sea
 Wellington Regional Economic Development Agency Ltd (WREDA)
 Wellington Water manages all three water services for Hutt, Porirua, Upper Hutt and Wellington city councils, and South Wairarapa District councils.
 Wellington Zoo Trust

The Council has a similar interest in the Wellington Regional Stadium Trust.

Sister-city relationships  

Sister cities
  Sydney, Australia
  Canberra, Australia
  Beijing, People's Republic of China
  Xiamen, Fujian, People's Republic of China
  Sakai, Osaka, Japan

Historical sister cities
  Harrogate, England, United Kingdom
  Hania, Crete, Greece
  Çanakkale, Turkey

Friendly cities
  Tianjin, People's Republic of China

History 

The City of Wellington has subsumed independent boroughs including:

 Melrose (established 1888) in 1903
 Onslow (Khandallah/Ngaio) (established 1890) in 1919 (Wadestown had joined the city in 1906) 
 Karori (established 1891) in 1920
 Miramar (established 1904) in 1921
 Johnsonville (a Town Board from 1908), in 1953
 Tawa (a Town district from 1951, then the Tawa Flat Borough Council from 1953) in 1989

Buildings 

The Wellington City Council owns and until May 2019 operated from a complex on Wakefield Street, with various extensions each representing a distinctive architectural period. The complex incorporates the Wellington Town Hall which opened in 1904, with the most recent extension completed in 1991 alongside the Wellington Central Library.

The Wakefield Street complex has been cleared of back office functions, and since 28 May 2019 will be closed completely for repairs and earthquake strengthening. In the interim, most of the council's central office staff are located in commercial premises at 113 The Terrace, and the council's public service centre is at 12 Manners Street. Due to repairs also being needed to the Wellington Central Library, and Capital E, all of the civic buildings on Civic Square are closed, except for the City Gallery.

Use of pseudoscience
In December 2019, at the New Zealand Skeptics annual conference, the Wellington City Council and the Downer Group were co-awarded the Bent Spoon by NZ Skeptics for "showing the most egregious gullibility in 2019" for the contractor's use of water divining to find underground pipes.

See also
Wellington Region

References 
Footnotes

Citations

 A Complete Guide To Heraldry by A.C. Fox-Davies 1909.

External links 

 WellingtonNZ.com
 Wellington City Council
 Wellington City Council maps

 
City councils in New Zealand